Menno Simons College is a Mennonite college in Winnipeg, Manitoba, Canada. It is a college of Canadian Mennonite University (CMU) and is one of CMU's three founding colleges. Menno Simons College, located in downtown Winnipeg, is also affiliated with the University of Winnipeg.

History
The college is named after Menno Simons, anabaptist leader and founder of the Mennonites. It received a provincial charter to grant degrees in 1982.

Programs
Through The University of Winnipeg, MSC offers 3- and 4-year programs in International Development Studies and Conflict Resolution Studies.

See also
List of universities in Manitoba
Higher education in Manitoba
Education in Canada

References

External links
 

Mennonite schools in Manitoba
Colleges in Manitoba
Universities and colleges in Winnipeg
Universities and colleges affiliated with the Mennonite Church
Educational institutions established in 1982
1982 establishments in Manitoba
University of Winnipeg
Schools in downtown Winnipeg